LETM1-like is a family of evolutionarily related proteins.

This is a group of mainly hypothetical eukaryotic proteins. Putative features found in LETM1, such as a transmembrane domain and a CK2 and PKC phosphorylation site, are relatively conserved throughout the family. Deletion of LETM1 is thought to be involved in the development of Wolf-Hirschhorn syndrome in humans. A member of this family, SWISSPROT, is known to be expressed in the mitochondria of Drosophila melanogaster, suggesting that this may be a group of mitochondrial proteins.

Examples 

Human gene encoding members of this family include:
 LETM1, LETM2, LETMD1

References

Protein families